Samuel Edward Cook (178711 January 1856) was an English writer.

Life
In 1840, he took the name of Widdrington, his mother being the heiress of some of the estates of that family. Having served in the Royal Navy he lived for some years in Spain, writing Sketches in Spain during the years 1829-1832 (London, 1834), and Spain and the Spaniards in 1843 (London, 1844). In 1842 he was elected a Fellow of the Royal Society.

He served as High Sheriff of Northumberland in 1854. He died at his residence, Newton Hall, Northumberland, in January 1856 and was succeeded in the ownership of his estates by his nephew, Shalcross Fitzherbert Jacson, who took the name Widdrington.

The name Widdringtonia conferred upon a genus of African coniferous trees in the Cupressaceae (cypress family) was Austrian botanist Stephan Endlicher's way of honouring Cook's great interest in Spain's coniferous forests, which the latter was among the first to detail scientifically.  In 1831 he collected an Azure-winged Magpie - then known only from the Far East - in southern Spain which has since been given full species status as Iberian Azure-winged Magpie and the scientific name Cyanopica cooki in his honour

See also

Notes

References
 John Hodgson, History of Northumberland (1820-1840).
 E. I. Carlyle, ‘Widdrington , Samuel Edward (1787–1856)’, rev. Ian Campbell Robertson, Oxford Dictionary of National Biography, Oxford University Press, 2004; online edition, October 2005, . Retrieved 26 February 2008

1787 births
1856 deaths
People from Morpeth, Northumberland
Writers from Northumberland
English travel writers
Royal Navy officers
High Sheriffs of Northumberland
Fellows of the Royal Society